Matteo Arnaldi was the defending champion but chose not to defend his title.

Matteo Gigante won the title after defeating Stefano Travaglia 6–3, 6–2 in the final.

Seeds

Draw

Finals

Top half

Bottom half

References

External links
Main draw
Qualifying draw

Tenerife Challenger III - 1